Euphaedra exerrata, the lesser-banded Themis forester, is a butterfly in the family Nymphalidae. It is found in Nigeria and Cameroon. The habitat consists of forests.

Adults are attracted to fallen fruit.

References

Butterflies described in 1982
exerrata